Ernest Augustus or Ernst August may refer to:

Royalty

House of Hanover
Ernest Augustus, Elector of Hanover (1629–1698), father of King George I of Great Britain
Ernest Augustus, Duke of York and Albany, Prince-Bishop of Osnabrück, son of the previous
Ernest Augustus, King of Hanover (1771–1851), son of King George III of the United Kingdom
Ernest Augustus, Crown Prince of Hanover, (1845–1923), son of George V of Hanover
Ernest Augustus, Duke of Brunswick (1887–1953), son of the previous
Prince Ernest Augustus of Hanover (1914–1987), son of the previous
Prince Ernst August of Hanover (born 1954), son of the previous
Prince Ernst August of Hanover (born 1983), son of previous

House of Wettin
Ernest Augustus I, Duke of Saxe-Weimar-Eisenach (1688–1748)
Ernest Augustus II, Duke of Saxe-Weimar-Eisenach (1737–1758), son of the previous

Other
Ernst August (ship), a ship named after Ernest Augustus, King of Hanover